Seis Manos (Six Hands) is an American adult animated streaming television series created by Brad Graeber and Álvaro Rodríguez. The plot is set in the fictional town of San Simon in 1970s Mexico and revolves around three orphans trained in Chinese martial arts. When their mentor is killed, they join forces with an American DEA agent and a policewoman to avenge his murder.

It was released on October 3, 2019 on Netflix.

Characters and cast

Main

Seis Manos
 Isabela – the eldest sibling of the Seis Manos, who acts as the heart for the trio keeping them together. She is a practitioner of the Hung Ga style of Chinese Martial Arts, and like her fighting style, she is a down to Earth person. Isabela has a just character, even willing to let Officer Garcia arrest Silencio for the murders he committed before Balde's arrival. Voiced by Aislinn Derbez
 Jesús – the robust jokester of the Seis Manos. He uses the Drunken boxing style of Chinese Martial Arts, and like his fighting style, he can still fight even when drunk. While the "idiot" of the group, he is emotionally wise in realizing Chiu's teachings about self-balance as events play out in season one. Voiced by Jonny Cruz
 Silencio – the mute younger brother of the Seis Manos, whose tongue was cut out as a boy witnessing El Balde kill his family. He uses the Bak Mei style of Chinese Martial Arts, and like his fighting style, his eyebrows become progressively more white as the series continues. He is plagued by rage from his traumatic youth. Over the events of season one, his actions keep triggering the escalation of problems, such as Balde's claim to San Simon and Lo's rise to power.

Allies
 Chiu – an old Chinese Kung-fu master who has trained the trio of orphans, Isabela, Jesús and Silencio. Chiu has some knowledge of the evil to which El Balde is a part of, but dies after fighting Jaimito in "Toppled". The trio learn that Chiu was an assassin in his youth, and stole a treasure with immortality to hide it from his evil mentor. Voiced by Vic Chao
 Garcia – a Mexican Federale and the first female one in her region, who just wants something interesting to happen in her small town; she regretfully gets her wish with Balde's forces invading her hometown. She receives Garabina's mystic knowledge by the end of season one, which aids the heroes in stopping El Balde. Voiced by Angélica Vale
 Brister – an African-American Vietnam veteran turned special agent for the DEA who cooperates with Garcia on assignment with the Bi-National Task Force. Voiced by Mike Colter

Enemies
 El Balde – The main antagonist. He was either mainly or partly responsible for the tragedies that led to the life paths of the Seis Manos. As a boy, his mother used his love for her to kill his father, and when she was to die from cancer, he buried her alive in a coffin which is also a statue to Santa Nucifera. As a cartel kingpin, he had plans that are reaching across Mexico with the use of his black powder from the Santa Nucifera statue. Voiced by Danny Trejo
 Alejandra – Balde's mother, and a witch with a Lotus crest medallion which is the source of her powers. It is her flesh that Balde uses to make monstrous servants and empower himself when battling. Her soul is imprisoned in her Lotus medallion, now in DEA custody.
 Master Lo – Chiu's mentor. Given the similarities of Lo's Peach Blossom sigil and Balde's Lotus sigil, Isabela realized some connection between them. He abducts Silencio with the goal to mold him into a weapon for his will.

Others
 Domingo – a 12-year-old orphan who hides at the dojo sanctuary of Chiu. After Jaimito's rampage in San Simon, Domingo is killed by a statue fall. Voiced by Carlos Luna
 Garabina – a curandera with insights into Balde, who helps the heroes in gaining evidence on Balde. She dies in episode "Blindfold" after telling Garcia how to stop El Balde.
 Lina – an auto mechanic who is also Silencio's lover. She had her right hand cut off by Balde in her childhood, creating a sympathetic relationship with Silencio. She admits to being one of Serrano's drug distributors, to keep the finances to ward off Balde. She is killed in "Reunion" by Lo.
 Padre Serrano – the town priest who was secretly a cartel Jefe, using his position to create a paradise in San Simon while engaging in illegal gains. He also acted as the only obstacle keeping El Balde at bay until his death in episode "Night of the Wolves."
 Jaimito – the first enemy of the series, his arrival in San Simon killed Chiu by heart attack, then manually killed others in town before the Seis Manos trio began their mission against El Balde.
 Larry – a DEA special agent in charge who was covertly working with El Balde to get rich with Federal Resources. Larry hates Brister for his insolence, as well as repeated affairs with his wife.

Production
Seis Manos is Powerhouse Animation Studios's first original property, created and developed completely in-house.

Episodes

Release
Seis Manos was released on October 3, 2019 on Netflix.

Reception

Critical response
The review aggregator website Rotten Tomatoes reported a 100% approval rating for the first season with an average rating of 7.75/10, based on 8 reviews.

References

External links

2010s American adult animated television series
2019 American television series debuts
2019 American television series endings
American adult animated action television series
Anime-influenced animation
Anime-influenced Western animation
Anime-influenced Western animated television series
American adult animated web series
English-language Netflix original programming
Animated television series about orphans
Martial arts television series
Television shows set in Mexico
Television series set in the 1970s
Animated television series by Netflix
Works about Mexican drug cartels